The Leghorn Hat is a 1939 German period comedy film directed by Wolfgang Liebeneiner and starring Heinz Rühmann, Herti Kirchner and Christl Mardayn. It is based on the 1851 play The Italian Straw Hat written by Eugène Labiche, which has been adapted for the screen on several occasions.

The film's sets were designed by the art directors Hans Sohnle and Wilhelm Vorwerg. It was shot at the Babelsberg Studios in Berlin. It premiered in Magdeburg on 4 April before opening at the Gloria-Palast in the capital on 18 April.

Cast 
 Heinz Rühmann as Theo Farina
 Herti Kirchner as Helene Barbock, seine Braut
 Christl Mardayn as Baronin Pamela v. Sarabant
 Paul Henckels as Baron Bubi v. Sarabant
 Victor Janson as Barbock
 Hannsgeorg Laubenthal as Leutnant Emil v. Parade
 Karel Štěpánek as Felix
 Gerda Maria Terno as Virginia
 Helmut Weiss as Bobby
 Hans Hermann Schaufuß as Onkel Florian
 Hubert von Meyerinck as Rosalba
 Elsa Wagner as Baronin Champigny
 Alexa von Porembsky as Clara
 Edith Meinhard as Zofe bei Baronin Champigny
 Paul Bildt as 1.Beamter 
 Franz Weber as 2. Beamter 
 Leopold von Ledebur as Zürus 
 Bruno Fritz as Leierkastenmann 
 Ernst Legal as Dienstmann
 Käthe Kamossa as Tante Walpurga

References

Bibliography
 Waldman, Harry. Nazi Films in America, 1933-1942. McFarland, 2008.

External links 

1939 films
1930s historical comedy films
German historical comedy films
Films of Nazi Germany
Films directed by Wolfgang Liebeneiner
Films set in France
Films set in the 19th century
Remakes of French films
Sound film remakes of silent films
German films based on plays
German black-and-white films
Terra Film films
Films shot at Babelsberg Studios
1939 comedy films
1930s German films